Borgiallo is a comune (municipality) in the Metropolitan City of Turin in the Italian region Piedmont, located about  north of Turin.

Borgiallo borders the following municipalities: Frassinetto, Castellamonte, Colleretto Castelnuovo, Castelnuovo Nigra, Chiesanuova, and Cuorgnè.

The parish church is San Nicolao.

References

Cities and towns in Piedmont